Ronit Matalon (May 25, 1959 – December 28, 2017) was an Israeli fiction writer.

Biography
Ronit Matalon was born in Ganei Tikva, Israel, the daughter of Egyptian Jewish immigrants. Matalon studied literature and philosophy at Tel Aviv University and worked as a journalist for Haaretz newspaper, where she covered Gaza and the West Bank between 1987 and 1993. She was a resident of Haifa and taught literature at the University of Haifa. She also taught at the Camera Obscura school for the Arts in Tel Aviv.

Matalon was also a liberal social activist, and participated in demonstrations organized by the Association for Civil Rights in Israel. She was a member of the Art and Culture Council of the Ministry of Education, and the Forum for Mediterranean Culture at the Van Leer Institute. In 2003, she was a co-petitioner to the Supreme Court of Israel to investigate the assassination of Salah Shehade.

Awards and recognition
 1994 – Prime Minister's Prize for Hebrew Literary Works
2009 – Bernstein Prize (original Hebrew novel category), for her novel "The Sound of Our Steps".
 2010 – Neuman prize, a literary prize given by Bar-Ilan University.
 2010 – Honorary Ph.D. from the Hebrew University of Jerusalem on June 6, 2010 for her contributions to literature and for her social activism.
 2016 – The EMET Prize for Art, Science and Culture (in Hebrew literature) 
 2017 – Brenner Prize for her novel, And the Bride Closed the Door (2016)

Novels

 Strangers at Home (1992)
 A Story that Begins with a Snake's Funeral (1994, children's book)
 The One Facing Us (1995)
 Sarah Sarah (2000)
 Reading and Writing (2001)
 Bliss (2003) 
 Uncover Her Face (2005)
 The Sound of Our Steps (2008)
 And the Bride Closed the Door (2016) Keter

Articles
"Weddings and Anti-Weddings", Haaretz, 2008

References

1959 births
2017 deaths
Israeli Jews
Israeli people of Egyptian-Jewish descent
Academic staff of the University of Haifa
Tel Aviv University alumni
Israeli novelists
Israeli children's writers
Bernstein Prize recipients
Brenner Prize recipients
EMET Prize recipients in Culture and Art
Israeli women children's writers
Israeli women novelists
Recipients of Prime Minister's Prize for Hebrew Literary Works
Deaths from cancer in Israel
Burials at Kiryat Shaul Cemetery
People from Central District (Israel)
Jewish women writers